The 2012 Valdosta State Blazers football team represented Valdosta State University as a member of the a member of the Gulf South Conference during the 2012 NCAA Division II football season. They were led by sixth-year head coach David Dean and played their home games at Bazemore–Hyder Stadium in Valdosta, Georgia. After a 2–2 start, Valdosta State won their next 10 games and defeated , 35–7, in the title game of the NCAA Division II National Football Championship.  The championship was the school's seventh national title, and the third in football. Dean was recognized as the AFCA Division II Coach of the Year. The national championship was Dean's second at Valdosta State, having led the Blazers to the NCAA Division II title in 2007, his first year as head coach. The Blazers finished the season 12–2 overall and 4–1 in conference play, placing second in the Gulf South behind , who beat Valdosta State in regular season, but then fell to the Blazers in the second round of the NCAA Division II playoffs.

Schedule

References

Valdosta State
Valdosta State Blazers football seasons
NCAA Division II Football Champions
Valdosta State Blazers football